Highlands Ranch is an unincorporated community and a census-designated place (CDP) located in and governed by Douglas County, Colorado, United States. The CDP is a part of the Denver–Aurora–Lakewood, CO Metropolitan Statistical Area. The population of the Highlands Ranch CDP was 105,631 at the United States Census 2020, making it the most populous unincorporated community in the State of Colorado. The Highlands Ranch Metropolitan District provides services to the community, which lies in ZIP Codes 80126, 80129, 80130, and 80163 (for post office boxes).

History

Beginnings
Like many parts of the Colorado Front Range, the first residents of the area were Native Americans. The area was populated by a number of nomadic tribes, including the Ute, Cheyenne and Arapaho tribes. Because it was part of the Mississippi River Drainage Area, it was claimed by France by French explorer René-Robert Cavelier, Sieur de La Salle and it was named as part of "Louisiana" in 1682. The Spanish gained Louisiana in 1763, and returned it to France in 1801. This area of what is now Northern Douglas County, was in the Louisiana Purchase when it was sold to the United States in 1803.

The Stephen H. Long's Expedition of 1820 entered the area at the beginning of July 1820. That was the first documented exploration of the area by European or United States explorers.

Much of the Denver Metro Area began to be settled as ranch land starting in 1859, but because of a lack of water in the area, it was not permanently settled until around 1870. The first legal settler of the area was Curtis H. Field, who purchased land just on the west side of Santa Fe Drive from the US government on February 25, 1870.

The Highlands Ranch Mansion (or "Castle Isabel") was built over a period of several years, from 1891 to 1904. The first owner of the house was Samuel Allan Long, who purchased a 40-acre homestead in northern Douglas County in 1884 and later expanded it to a 2,000-acre farm. By 1891 he had built a modest farmhouse on the property and called it Rotherwood after a boyhood farm. The name "Rotherwood", a reference to a boyhood farm of Long's, was found etched above the original front door that led experts to believe so. Long was a prominent innovator of dry land farming techniques in Colorado during the late 19th century.

John W. Springer bought the ranch in 1898 and built the Highlands Ranch Mansion. He built it up to a 10,000 acre ranch and farm. It was called "Castle Isabel" for a time for his second wife Isabel Patterson Springer. He began selling off parts of the ranch in 1911. The mansion underwent a renovation from 2010-2012 that was funded by Shea Homes.

20th century
The Colorado Gold Rush brought people to Colorado in droves during the late 19th and early 20th centuries. The city of Denver, located approximately 12 miles to the north, grew considerably during this time. However, the area remained a series of farms and ranches, and many residents would visit the town of Littleton, a few miles northward, when they needed to purchase clothing, supplies, or other items.

The Springer land was bought and sold several times throughout the 1920s and 1930s. In 1937 it was bought by Lawrence C. Phipps, Jr., who used it to raise cattle and hunt fox. After Phipps died in 1976, the land was bought by Marvin Davis, the owner of an oil company.

Becoming a suburb
In 1978, a large parcel of land in unincorporated Douglas County was purchased by The Mission Viejo Company. As the suburbs of Denver expanded, the company desired to build a new planned suburb, called Highlands Ranch, in northern Douglas County, akin to its first planned development of Mission Viejo, California. Initial plans were drawn up, many of which are still being realized. These plans laid out several major streets and called for several schools and recreation centers, as well as a town center and public library. Large parcels of land were sold to private housing developers, such as Richmond Homes. As these developments appeared, they often carried their own names, creating a series of segmented neighborhoods throughout Highlands Ranch. Plans for Highlands Ranch also included a snaking "green belt" which provided for undeveloped land for recreation. The plans also allowed for a large number of public parks and bike paths.

The first homes in Highlands Ranch were built in 1981, near South Broadway. Simultaneously, the state built a new freeway through the area, C-470, which opened in 1985. Many of the first residents of Highlands Ranch complained about the initial lack of commercial development. Residents had to drive many miles (usually into Littleton) for groceries, entertainment, or medical care. The first public school, Northridge Elementary, opened in 1982. The same year also saw the completion of the Northridge Recreation Center, an athletic club available to all Highlands Ranch homeowners. The first secondary school, Highlands Ranch Jr/Sr High School, opened in 1987. This institution became solely a high school, named Highlands Ranch High School, in 1991 with the building of nearby Cresthill Middle School. The first Highlands Ranch branch of Douglas County Libraries also opened in 1991, housed in a strip mall off Broadway and Springer Drive.

Recent history
Over the next 25 years, the population of Highlands Ranch increasingly expanded. Highlands Ranch celebrated its 10th anniversary in 1991 with a population of 17,000 residents. Over the next ten years, Highlands Ranch continued to develop on a large scale.

In 1997, The Mission Viejo Company was acquired by Shea Properties, which continued to expand the community. This included bringing a regional office of Lucent Technologies, and later in the same complex Avaya Communication, to the area. The year 2000 saw the opening of a much larger Highlands Ranch Library as well as the establishment of the Highlands Ranch Chamber of Commerce.

On May 7, 2019, two students opened fire at the STEM School Highlands Ranch, killing one student and injuring eight others. The school is located near Columbine High School, where a mass shooting occurred in 1999.

Geography

As a suburb of Denver, Highlands Ranch is part of both the greater Denver metropolitan area and the Front Range Urban Corridor. It borders several other Denver suburbs including Littleton and Centennial to the north and Acres Green and Lone Tree to the east. In addition, Highlands Ranch borders Chatfield State Park to the west. As Highlands Ranch is a CDP, its boundaries are defined by the U.S. Census Bureau and have no legal standing.

Demographics

As of the 2010 census, there were 96,713 people, 34,054 households, and 26,535 families residing in the CDP. The racial makeup of the CDP was 88.7% White, 5.6% Asian, 1.2% African American, 0.4% American Indian, 0.0% Pacific Islander, 1.4% from other races, and 2.6% from two or more races. Hispanics and Latinos of any race were 7.2% of the population.

There were 34,054 households, out of which 48.0% had children under the age of 18 living with them, 67.5% were married couples living together, 3.1% had a male householder with no wife present, 7.3% had a female householder with no husband present, and 22.1% were non-families. 18.2% of all households were made up of individuals, and 4.3% had someone living alone who was 65 years of age or older. The average household size was 2.84, and the average family size was 3.27.

The distribution of the population by age was 32.0% under the age of 18, 5.0% from 18 to 24, 30.3% from 25 to 44, 26.1% from 45 to 64, and 6.6% who were 65 years of age or older. The median age was 36.3 years. The gender makeup of the CDP was 49.1% male and 50.9% female.

The median income for a household in the CDP was $104,411, and the median income for a family was $113,944. Males had a median income of $84,067 versus $54,962 for females. The CDP's per capita income was $43,137. About 1.1% of families and 1.6% of the population were below the poverty line, including 1.4% of those under age 18 and 1.8% of those age 65 or over.

Economy
As of 2013, 74.9% of the population over the age of 16 was in the labor force. 0.1% was in the armed forces, and 74.8% was in the civilian labor force with 71.1% employed and 3.7% unemployed. The occupational composition of the employed civilian labor force was: 58.2% in management, business, science, and arts; 26.4% in sales and office occupations; 8.6% in service occupations; 3.7% in production, transportation, and material moving; 3.2% in natural resources, construction, and maintenance. The three industries employing the largest percentages of the working civilian labor force were: educational services, health care, and social assistance (20.5%); professional, scientific, and management, and administrative and waste management services (16.1%); finance and insurance, and real estate and rental and leasing (12.2%).

The cost of living in Highlands Ranch is above average; compared to a U.S. average of 100, the cost of living index for the community is 107.4. As of 2013, the median home value in the CDP was $335,900, the median selected monthly owner cost was $2,070 for housing units with a mortgage and $533 for those without, and the median gross rent was $1,504.

Notable companies headquartered in Highlands Ranch include UDR, Inc. and Peterson's. Visa Inc.'s Operations Center Central is based in Highlands Ranch.

Government
Highlands Ranch is an unincorporated community within Douglas County. Most municipal services, such as the construction and upkeep of arterial roads, parks and open space areas, are performed by the Highlands Ranch Metro District, a special district under state law, which is funded mostly by property taxes and state lottery funds. Highlands Ranch is policed by Douglas County Sheriffs Office, with South Metro Fire Rescue providing fire protection, and all public schools are part of the Douglas County School System.

In addition, all Highlands Ranch residents are asked to sign and follow a community covenant as dictated by the Highlands Ranch Community Association or "HRCA". This covenant places firm guidelines on such issues as housing decoration, fencing, and contribution to the area's library and recreation centers. The Highlands Ranch Community Association obtains its funding through common homeowner association fees and covenant violation fines and, for this reason, is not usually recognized as a government, but rather as a local non-profit organization.

Highlands Ranch lies within Colorado's 6th U.S. Congressional District. For the purposes of representation in the Colorado General Assembly, the CDP is located in the 30th district of the Colorado Senate and the 39th and 43rd districts of the Colorado House of Representatives.

ZIP codes 80126, 80129, 80130, and 80163 – assigned by default to the adjacent City of Littleton – serve Highlands Ranch.

Education
Highlands Ranch is served by the Douglas County School District.

High schools
 Highlands Ranch High School
 Mountain Vista High School
 Rock Canyon High School
 SkyView Academy
 STEM School Highlands Ranch
 ThunderRidge High School
 Valor Christian High School (Private)

Middle schools
 Ben Franklin Academy (Charter)
 Cherry Hills Christian Middle School (Private)
 Cresthill Middle School
 Mountain Ridge Middle School
 Platte River Academy (Charter)
 Ranch View Middle School
 STEM School Highlands Ranch
 Skyview Academy
 Rocky Heights Middle School

Elementary schools
 Arma Dei Academy (Private)
 Arrowwood Elementary
 Acres Green Elementary
 Bear Canyon Elementary
 Ben Franklin Academy (Charter)
 Buffalo Ridge Elementary School
 Cherry Hills Christian School (Private)
 Copper Mesa Elementary
 Cougar Run Elementary
 Coyote Creek Elementary
 Eagle Ridge Elementary 
 Eldorado Elementary
 Fox Creek Elementary
 Heritage Elementary
 Northridge Elementary
 North Star Academy Charter School (Charter)
 Platte River Academy (Charter)
 Redstone Elementary
 Saddle Ranch Elementary
 Sand Creek Elementary
 Summit View Elementary
 STEM School Highlands Ranch
 Stone Mountain Elementary
 Timber Trail Elementary
 Trailblazer Elementary
 Wildcat Mountain Elementary
 Sky Ridge Academy
 Skyview Academy (Charter)

Notable people

Notable individuals who were born in or have lived in Highlands Ranch include actress Keri Russell, physicist William C. Davidon,
NFL All Pro Running Back Christian McCaffrey, U.S. Olympic luger Courtney Zablocki, Czech hockey player Milan Hejduk, and Ethan Horvath, goalkeeper for the United States and Nottingham Forest, and Jacob Lissek, professional and international goalkeeper. Retired soccer player, Taylor Kemp.

See also

Outline of Colorado
Index of Colorado-related articles
State of Colorado
Colorado cities and towns
Colorado census designated places
Colorado counties
Douglas County, Colorado
List of statistical areas in Colorado
Front Range Urban Corridor
North Central Colorado Urban Area
Denver-Aurora-Boulder, CO Combined Statistical Area
Denver-Aurora-Broomfield, CO Metropolitan Statistical Area

References

External links

Highlands Ranch Community Association
Highlands Ranch Metropolitan District
Highlands Ranch Mansion
Highlands Ranch @ Colorado.com
Highlands Ranch @ UncoverColorado.com
Highlands Ranch Online
Highlands Ranch Herald
Douglas County website
Douglas County School District
Douglas County @ Twitter
Douglas County @ Flickr

Census-designated places in Douglas County, Colorado
Census-designated places in Colorado
Denver metropolitan area